Lovers and Leaders is the third album from Sacha Sacket.

Track listing

 Hail     4:22
 Judy (For Shame)     4:19
 Stay     3:31
 Halo     4:08
 Brandon Boyd     3:55
 Maybe You Can Save Me (From You)     3:49
 How Low?     4:14
 Jove     4:08
 What You Are     3:08
 Hallowed (Show Me How)     4:46
 Time To Go     3:44

Reviews
ALLALOM Music Review
Edge New York Review

2007 albums
Sacha Sacket albums